Ion Donțu (born 9 September 1999) is a Moldovan football player. He plays for FC Codru Lozova on loan from FC Zimbru Chișinău.

Club career
He made his Moldovan National Division debut for FC Zimbru Chișinău on 1 April 2018 in a game against FC Milsami Orhei.

References

External links
 

1999 births
Living people
Moldovan footballers
Association football forwards
FC Zimbru Chișinău players
FC Codru Lozova players
Moldovan Super Liga players